Thorbjørn Lie (17 December 1943 – 19 November 2006) was a Norwegian businessperson and politician for the Progress Party.

He was born in Lardal, but later settled in Førde. As a businessperson Lie is notable for founding the helicopter company Airlift in 1987. For a period he was the chief executive officer of the company. He has also been chairman and co-owner of Helilift.

Lie became a member of Sogndal municipal council in 2003. He later served as a deputy representative to the Parliament of Norway from Sogn og Fjordane during the term 2005–2009, but died only one year into the term.

References

1943 births
2006 deaths
Norwegian company founders
Deputy members of the Storting
Progress Party (Norway) politicians
Sogn og Fjordane politicians